
Tio i Topp was a radio show that first broadcast in 1961 and was the first official Swedish music chart. Initially broadcast through Sveriges Radio P2, it switched to Sveriges Radio P3 in 1964. Sveriges Radio started the chart in response to criticism from the public, who felt that there wasn't enough material oriented towards a young audience on their radio stations, but also as a way to combat music charts from pirate radio stations Radio Nord and Radio Syd, who had started compiling charts during the late 1950s. The idea behind the show was coined by Carl-Eiwar Carlsson and Klas Burling, who both had history of working in record shops and as such knew what records most teenagers and young adults were buying and consuming and thus wanted to lead a radio show based on this.

Unlike contemporary record charts, who often compiled lists based on record sales, Tio i Topp based their list on audience reaction; each week a jury consisting of about 200 people were placed in front of a mentometer upon which 15 songs are plaid through speakers, after which they'd vote on the song they liked most. Ten of these went to the finals while the remaining five had a chance the following show. New songs were introduced to the program each week which all weren't singles; several songs that reached number one on Tio i Topp were either not released as singles or were album tracks. An example of this is "Very Last Day" by the Hollies, which had been featured on their eponymous 1965 album and wasn't released as a single in most of the world; it reached number one in June 1966.

This way of compiling charts also attracted criticism, who thought that records that sold well didn't get the chance. This led to Sveriges Radio starting Kvällstoppen, which compiled a weekly chart based on sales rather than an audience response during the summer of 1962. Both charts competed with each other throughout the 1960s and early 1970s before Tio i Topp ceased broadcasting during the summer of 1974; the growing progg grew distain for commercialism which Tio i Topp was considered a Swedish milestone in. The first song to reach number one on the chart was "I'm Gonna Knock on Your Door" by Eddie Hodges on 14 October 1961. The last number one was "Sugar Baby Love" by the Rubettes on 29 June 1974.

Chart history

1961

1962

1963 

 The voting that was to take place on 23 November 1963 in Stockholm and Falun was cancelled as Sveriges Radio held a memorial for United States president John F. Kennedy, who had been assassinated the day before.

1964

1965 

 The voting that was to take place on 20 November 1965 was cancelled as Sveriges Radio held a show known as Europatoppen in its place.
 The voting that was to take place on 25 December 1965 was cancelled as it was Christmas Day, a holiday.

1966 

 The chart that was compiled on 8 January 1966 is often considered disqualified from the Tio i Topp canon because of Lenne and the Lee Kings doing a voting coup in order to secure votes for their "Stop The Music".
 On 3 September 1966, following Sommartoppen, the standard two jury cities were expanded to three to combat voting coups.
 The voting that was to take place on 19 November 1966 was cancelled as Sveriges Radio held a show known as Europatoppen in its place.
 The voting that was to take place on 24 December 1966 was cancelled as it was Christmas Day, a holiday.
 1966 was the last year to feature Sommartoppen, which would not return again.

1967 

 Stockholm was disqualified as a permanent jury city following a voting coup by the band Science Poption in order to make their single "Buckingham Palace" a hit.

1968 

 From 1 June 1968 onwards, the jury cities and voting system were abolished entirely; instead Sveriges Radio now relied on the government agency Statistiska Centralbyrån (SCB) to call up people across the country every week.

1969

1970

1971

1972

1973

1974

See also 
 List of number-one singles and albums in Sweden, a contemporary (2022) list of number-one singles in Sweden.

References

Sources 

 

Record charts
1960s record charts
1970s record charts
1960s in Swedish music
1970s in Swedish music